Serpong City Football Club or Serpong City FC is an Indonesian football team based in Serpong, South Tangerang, Banten. They currently competes in Liga 3, started as just a soccer school club in 2012, in 2021, they were inaugurated at the PSSI congress as a professional football club.

History
Initially, Serpong City was a football school that was founded on December 12, 2012. The academy was fully supported by the Ronny Pattinasarani Foundation, Serpong City Soccer School (SCSS) was founded by coach Ricky Nelson with the motto "Better Skill Better Football". they have the vision and mission to focus on developing the individual skills of players and also train mentally.

On 29 May 2021, when the PSSI congress became a momentum for them, at that time Serpong City was inaugurated as a new member of PSSI and was ready to compete in Indonesian Liga 3 for the first time, they are like being reborn as a Professional Football Club. Serpong City has continued to nurture and produce many young players for 9 years since 2012, and after being inaugurated as a professional club, Serpong City only has to continue the football pyramid of coaching that was previously owned.

On 3 November 2021, Serpong City made their first league match debut in a 3–1 win against club from Cilegon Jagat F.C. at the Krakatau Steel Stadium, in the next match, Serpong City will face a team also from South Tangerang Bintang Junior. two days later, in that match, they had their second match in an 8–0 biggest win against Bintang Junior. On 15 November, they closed the match in the group stage of the 2021 Liga 3 Banten zone in an 11–1  biggest win against Gundala, with this result, they qualified for the second round as runners-up Group C. On 25 November, they qualified for the semi-finals of the Liga 3 Banten zone as group F winners after their match won 3–0 over Persipan Pandeglang. but the unsatisfactory result occurred during the semi-final match against Persikota Tangerang three days later, they failed to reach the final after draw 0–0 in the first half to extra time, and lost on penalties (4–5). Serpong City qualified for the 2021 Liga 3 national round with the title of third place in the Banten zone after in their match they won 2–1 over Matrix Putra Brother's.

On 6 February 2022, in the national round match, they managed to get their first win after a 3–0 win over NZR Sumbersari at the Gajayana Stadium, Malang.

Players

Current squad

Stadium
They also chose Sabnani Park in North Serpong, South Tangerang, as their home base. The choice was taken because Sabnani Park has international standard facilities.

Sabnani Park was built and planted with grass according to FIFA and AFC standards. The field with dimensions of 40x30m is an ideal size for the development of children aged 5–12 years, with a 7v7 and 9v9 playing pattern.

References

External links
 Serpong City F.C. at Instagram

South Tangerang
Football clubs in Banten
Football clubs in Indonesia
Association football clubs established in 2012
2012 establishments in Indonesia